

Final standings

ACC tournament
See 1956 ACC men's basketball tournament

NCAA tournament

Round of 25
Canisius 79, NC State 78 (4 OT)

NIT
League rules prevented ACC teams from playing in the NIT, 1954–1966